The 2006 Great American Bash was the third annual Great American Bash professional wrestling pay-per-view (PPV) event produced by World Wrestling Entertainment (WWE), and 17th Great American Bash event overall. It was held exclusively for wrestlers from the promotion's SmackDown! brand division. The event took place on July 23, 2006, at the Conseco Fieldhouse in Indianapolis, Indiana. It was the final Great American Bash PPV to be brand-exclusive as following WrestleMania 23 the following year, brand-exclusive PPVs were discontinued.

The main event was Rey Mysterio Jr. versus King Booker for the World Heavyweight Championship, which Booker won by pinfall after Chavo Guerrero interfered. One of the predominant matches on the card was The Undertaker versus Big Show in the first Punjabi Prison match, which Undertaker won by escaping the structure. Another primary match on the undercard was Batista versus Mr. Kennedy, which Kennedy won after Batista was disqualified.

The Great Khali and Bobby Lashley were originally scheduled to compete in their respective matches against The Undertaker in the Punjabi Prison match and against Finlay for the WWE United States Championship, but they were both pulled from the event due to elevated enzymes in the liver that would possibly signify hepatitis. Further tests came back clear for them both after the event. Mark Henry was also scheduled to compete against the returning Batista in a grudge match, however he ruptured his patellar tendon and dislocated his kneecap just before this event in a match on Saturday Night's Main Event XXXIII, forcing a replacement in the form of Mr. Kennedy.

Production

Background
The Great American Bash is a professional wrestling event established in 1985. Following World Wrestling Entertainment's (WWE) acquisition of World Championship Wrestling (WCW) in March 2001, WWE revived the pay-per-view (PPV) in 2004. The 2006 event was the third annual Great American Bash produced by WWE and 17th overall. It took place on July 23, 2006, at the Conseco Fieldhouse in Indianapolis, Indiana. Like the previous two years, it featured wrestlers exclusively from the SmackDown! brand.

Storylines
The main feud heading into The Great American Bash was between Rey Mysterio Jr. and King Booker over the World Heavyweight Championship. On the July 7 episode of SmackDown!, Booker became the number one contender to the World Heavyweight Championship by last eliminating William Regal and Matt Hardy in a Battle Royal. Later that night, Booker and Queen Sharmell, Booker's wife, attacked Mysterio backstage, and executed a low blow.

The following week, on SmackDown!, Mysterio faced off against William Regal, a member of Booker's Court. Booker, who was providing commentary for the match, attempted to interfere and attack Mysterio. Mysterio, however, attacked Booker and pinned Regal for the win. After the match, Mysterio executed a 619 and a seated senton on Booker. On the edition of July 21 of SmackDown!, Mysterio defeated Booker in a non-title match. Mysterio pinned Booker after a 619 following interference from Chavo Guerrero Jr.

Another primary feud heading into the event was between The Great Khali and The Undertaker. At the previous SmackDown! brand pay-per-view event, Judgment Day, Khali defeated The Undertaker. One month later, on the edition of June 30 of SmackDown!, Khali challenged Undertaker to a Punjabi Prison match at The Great American Bash. The following week, Undertaker accepted Khali's challenge.

Event

Before the live broadcast of the event began, Funaki defeated Simon Dean in a dark match.

The first match of the event was Paul London and Brian Kendrick facing The Pit Bulls (Jamie Noble and Kid Kash) for the WWE Tag Team Championship. London and Kendrick controlled most of the match, as they performed a variety of double-team maneuvers. Kendrick pinned Noble with a sunset flip with a dropsault from London to win the match and retain the title.

The next match saw Finlay defend the WWE United States Championship against William Regal. Prior to the match, General manager Theodore Long announced that Bobby Lashley, who was previously scheduled to be in the match, could not compete due to elevated enzymes in his liver. Finlay had the advantage throughout the match, as The Little Bastard attacked Regal numerous times. Finlay pinned Regal with his feet on the ropes after hitting him with Regal's boot, which had been taken off by the Little Bastard, to win the match and retain the title.

The third match was Gregory Helms versus Matt Hardy, who was substituting for Super Crazy, who was also suffering from elevated enzymes in his liver. The match went back and forth, as each man was able to gain the advantage. In the end, Helms pinned Hardy while holding onto his tights to win.

The match that followed was Big Show versus The Undertaker in the first-ever Punjabi Prison match. In order to win the match, one must escape both the inner and outer bamboo structures. On-screen, General Manager Theodore Long put Big Show in the match instead of The Great Khali for attacking Undertaker backstage. In reality, Khali was not medically cleared to compete as, like Lashley and Super Crazy, he had elevated levels of enzymes in his liver. Both Big Show and Undertaker managed to escape the inner structure. While fighting in the space between the two structures, Big Show threw Undertaker through the outer. Undertaker's feet hit the floor first, therefore being declared the winner.

The following match was a Fatal Four-Way Bra and Panties match between Ashley Massaro, Kristal Marshall, Jillian Hall, and Michelle McCool. Massaro won the match after last stripping Kristal of her top.

The sixth match was between Batista and Mr. Kennedy. During the match, Batista slammed Kennedy's head into the steel steps, which cut Kennedy and exposed his cranium. Kennedy won the match after Batista was disqualified for failing to release a choke he had applied on Kennedy. After the match, Kennedy received twenty stitches to close the cuts he received during the match.

The main event saw Rey Mysterio defend the World Heavyweight Championship against King Booker. In the end, Chavo Guerrero came out to supposedly help Mysterio. As Guerrero looked to hit Booker with a steel chair, he turned on Mysterio and hit him with it instead. Booker pinned Mysterio to win the title.

Aftermath
Following The Great American Bash, a rematch between King Booker and Rey Mysterio for the World Heavyweight Championship took place. The match saw King Booker retain the World Heavyweight Championship, after interference from Chavo Guerrero On the August 4 episode of SmackDown!, in a scheduled match, Batista defeated Mr. Kennedy. SmackDown! commentator Michael Cole congratulated Batista on his win. Batista informed Cole to save his congratulations until after he won back the World Heavyweight Championship. The following week, Batista thanked King Booker for holding onto "his" World Heavyweight Championship and told him he would be needing it back at SummerSlam. At SummerSlam, Batista defeated King Booker by disqualification after Queen Sharmell interfered.

Following Chavo Guerrero's interference in Rey Mysterio's World Heavyweight Championship match with King Booker, Guerrero and Mysterio began a storyline with one another, which would last for three months. The following week, Guerrero explained why he attacked Mysterio at The Great American Bash. He claimed Mysterio was a leech living of the Guerrero family name, and that he was using that to elevate his career.

Two weeks later, on the August 18 episode of SmackDown!, General Manager Theodore Long announced that Mysterio and Guerrero would face off against one another at SummerSlam. Guerrero won the match after executing a frog splash following interference from Vickie Guerrero.

A rivalry between Matt Hardy and Gregory Helms began after facing off at the Great American Bash. On August 25, on SmackDown!, Helms interfered in a match between Mr. Kennedy and Hardy, in which Kennedy won. The following week, Hardy and Helms met in a non-title match, in which Hardy won. The two continued their feud over the following months, including a match at No Mercy won by Hardy.

The Undertaker and The Great Khali would continue to feud until the August 18 edition of SmackDown!, where Undertaker defeated Khali in a Last Man Standing match.

The 2006 Great American Bash would be the final to be SmackDown!-exclusive, as following WrestleMania 23 in April 2007, WWE discontinued brand-exclusive PPVs.

Results

References

External links
Official Great American Bash 2006 website

2006 in Indiana
Events in Indiana
Events in Indianapolis
2006
Professional wrestling in Indianapolis
2006 WWE pay-per-view events
July 2006 events in the United States
WWE SmackDown